The Jindong Movie Theater is a movie theater in Jinsha Township, Kinmen County, Fuchien, Republic of China.

History
The theater was built in 1950 by donation from Chang Hsiang-chuan to award the officers and soldiers in the county. The theater became popular with local people in which it turned the surrounding area into a bustling economic activities. Around the year 2000, the theater was closed but was reopened again in 2020.

Architecture
The theater building was constructed with bricks and cements. It also displays a white writing What are We Fighting for on its red wall.

See also
 Cinema of Taiwan

References

1950 establishments in Taiwan
Buildings and structures completed in 1950
Buildings and structures in Kinmen County
Cinemas in Taiwan
Jinsha Township
Tourist attractions in Kinmen County